USASpending.gov is a database of spending by the United States federal government.

History
Around the time of the Act's passage, OMB Watch, a government watchdog group, was developing a site that would do essentially everything the legislation required.
Gary Bass, director of OMB Watch, contacted Robert Shea, associate director of the OMB, offering to help with development of the new site. Shea was initially reluctant to collaborate with Bass, in part because OMB Watch is typically critical of the OMB, but eventually it was determined that the government site would be based on what OMB Watch was developing, with the group being paid $600,000 for their technology. As of early 2008, the government's site offered the same data, API, and (for the most part) documentation as the OMB Watch site, fedspending.org.

The Federal Funding Accountability and Transparency Act of 2006 delegated responsibility for creating the website to the Office of Management and Budget. On May 9, 2017, Steven Mnuchin, the United States Secretary of the Treasury, announced that he updated the site, providing a much broader view of government spending.

It has been reported that the 2011 United States federal budget holds a substantial reduction in funding for the Electronic Government Fund, from which USASpending.gov draws its funding.

References

External links
 USASpending.gov – official government spending database

Government services web portals in the United States